Holly T. Shikada (born c. 1960) is an American politician attorney serving as the Attorney General of Hawaii. She was appointed on December 10, 2021 by Governor David Ige, upon the resignation of Clare Connors.  The Hawaii Senate confirmed her nomination on April 19, 2022.

Education
Shikada attended the University of Hawaiʻi at Mānoa, where she earned a Bachelor of Arts in accounting, and earned a Juris Doctor from the William S. Richardson School of Law.

Career 
Shikada was admitted to the Hawaii bar in October 1985.  She started her career with the law firm  Fujiyama Duffy & Fujiyama before serving over 30 years as a deputy Attorney General. Shikada was responsible for leading a unit to enforce the Felix Consent Decree. Shikada then served 18 years as the supervising deputy Attorney General for the Education Division before being appointed First Deputy Attorney General in March 2021. 

In 2021, Clare Connors resigned as Attorney General to accept an appointment as the United States Attorney for the District of Hawaii. Governor David Ige, appointed Shikada to succeed Connors on December 10, 2021.

References

Living people
Year of birth missing (living people)
21st-century American women lawyers
21st-century American lawyers
Hawaii Attorneys General
University of Hawaiʻi at Mānoa alumni
William S. Richardson School of Law alumni